Analetia is a genus of moths of the family Noctuidae.

Species
 Analetia micacea (Hampson, 1891)

References
 Analetia at Markku Savela's Lepidoptera and Some Other Life Forms
 Natural History Museum Lepidoptera genus database

Mythimnini
Noctuoidea genera